Necterosoma is a genus of beetles in the family Dytiscidae, containing the following species:

 Necterosoma aphrodite Watts, 1978
 Necterosoma darwinii (Babington, 1841)
 Necterosoma dispar (Germar, 1848)
 Necterosoma novaecaledoniae J.Balfour-Browne, 1939
 Necterosoma penicillatum (Clark, 1862)
 Necterosoma regulare Sharp, 1882
 Necterosoma schmeltzi Sharp, 1882
 Necterosoma susanna Zwick, 1979
 Necterosoma theonathani Hendrich, 2003
 Necterosoma undecimlineatum (Babington, 1841)

References

Dytiscidae